Alison Pill (born November 27, 1985) is a Canadian actress. A former child actress, Pill began her career at age 12, appearing in numerous films and television series. She transitioned to adult roles and her breakthrough came with the television series The Book of Daniel (2006). That same year, she was nominated for a Tony Award for Best Featured Actress in a Play for her performance in The Lieutenant of Inishmore (2006).
Pill had prominent roles in the films Confessions of a Teenage Drama Queen (2004), Plain Truth (2004), Milk (2008), Scott Pilgrim vs. the World (2010), Midnight in Paris (2011), Hail, Caesar! (2016), Vice (2018), the television series In Treatment (2009), The Pillars of the Earth (2010), The Newsroom (2012–2014),  American Horror Story: Cult (2017), Star Trek: Picard (20202022), Devs (2020), and Them (2021).

Early life
Pill was born in Toronto, Ontario, Canada. Her father, a professional engineer, is Estonian. Pill attended Vaughan Road Academy, in its Interact program, designed for studying dance, music, athletics, and theatre.

Career

1997–2007 

Pill decided to become an actor when she was 10 years old. As a member of the Toronto Children's Chorus, she was chosen to narrate one of their performances. Her mother tried to discourage Pill by getting her a job as a background performer on the series Kung Fu: The Legend Continues. By the time she was 11, she had played a guest role on an episode of the children's series The New Ghostwriter Mysteries. At 12, she landed roles in two TV movies and a mini-series, a guest appearance on the TV series Psi Factor and voiced the character "Cornflower" on the animated series "Redwall" (1999–2001). After roles in two more television movies, she landed her first feature film role, a small-budget Canadian movie called The Life Before This in 1999, followed by the role of Jacob's older sister Marfa in Jacob Two Two Meets the Hooded Fang. Pill played roles in four more TV movies before the age of fourteen. The next year, she landed a small role in Skipped Parts in 2000 starring Drew Barrymore and Mischa Barton, then appeared in four more TV movies and features that year, including playing Farrah Fawcett's daughter in the TNT network movie Baby and a lead role in the Canadian film The Dinosaur Hunter, which was originally intended to be shown at a dinosaur museum and on a provincial education channel, but which made its way to the Burbank International Film Festival, winning Pill an award for Best Child Actress. She landed the role of young Lorna in the ABC-TV biopic Life with Judy Garland: Me and My Shadows in 2001, based on the memoir by Garland's daughter, Lorna Luft. That year, Pill also played Sissy Spacek's daughter in the TV flick Midwives.

In 2003, she played Katie Holmes's sister in the indie feature Pieces of April. Pill won the lead in the CTV-TV movie Fast Food High, about a teenager who gets a job at a fast food restaurant and tries to set up a union. She also landed a supporting role in Confessions of a Teenage Drama Queen in 2003, starring Lindsay Lohan. Pill ventured off into stage acting, with the New York City staging of None of the Above as the first item in her theatre credentials. This was followed by The Distance From Here, On the Mountain, Blackbird, and Mauritius. In 2006, she starred as Grace Webster in the short-lived NBC drama The Book of Daniel. That same year, she was nominated for the Tony Award for Best Featured Actress in a Play for her performance as Mairead in Martin McDonagh's The Lieutenant of Inishmore. Because of her busy work schedule, Pill's schooling was done through a program for youngsters in the business. Since graduating from high school, Pill moved to New York to pursue a career in theatre, but continued to work in movies such as Dan in Real Life in 2007.

2008–present 
Pill had a major supporting role as campaign manager Anne Kronenberg in the 2008 film Milk. In 2009, she performed with Erin Hill & her Psychedelic Harp playing the Twilight Zone-inspired "Meredith Moon" and "The Real North Pole" sci-fi Christmas Harp. Pill was cast as April on In Treatment. In 2009 she replaced Elliot Page in a role in Jack & Diane but due to postponement of the project neither ended up in it by the time it ran in 2012.

She later played Kim Pine in the movie Scott Pilgrim vs. the World, as well as in Scott Pilgrim vs. the Animation. She portrayed Empress Maud in the miniseries The Pillars of the Earth. In theatre, Pill starred with Abigail Breslin in Broadway's The Miracle Worker. She has worked with Woody Allen twice, as Zelda Fitzgerald in Midnight in Paris and as Hayley in To Rome with Love.

She has starred in short films including Denise in 2012 with Chris Messina and Santa Baby; she sang and danced in Santa Baby. In 2016, she appeared in Cover Up by Satya Bhabha with Jason Ritter, to be released at the LA Shorts Fest, and Woman in Deep, where she played a woman who calls a suicide prevention hot line and is put on hold, directed by Janicza Bravo. In a new theatre production of Wait Until Dark, Pill starred as a blind woman who must fend for her life. She also starred in Bong Joon-ho's post-apocalyptic film Snowpiercer, alongside Chris Evans and Tilda Swinton, which was released in 2013.

From 2012 until its ending in 2014, she appeared in Aaron Sorkin's HBO series The Newsroom as Maggie Jordan. Pill appeared in Cooties starring Elijah Wood. In Zoom, Pill played Emma, an aspiring comic book artist. She had a part in Hail, Caesar! as Eddie Mannix's wife. Pill starred in Goon: Last of the Enforcers as Eva Glatt, Glatt's love interest in first movie Goon, now married to Glatt. Pill was part of the cast of The Family as Willa Warren. In 2016, Pill co-starred with Jessica Chastain in the EuropaCorp thriller Miss Sloane. In 2017, she joined American Horror Story: Cult, starring as Ivy Mayfair-Richards, one of the main characters of the storyline. In 2018 she played former Vice President Dick Cheney's daughter Mary in the Oscar-nominated film Vice.

In 2020, she was part of the TV series Devs directed by Alex Garland on FX on Hulu, playing Katie, the chief designer of the Devs system.

In 2021, she starred in the film All My Puny Sorrows with Sarah Gadon, as two Mennonite sisters who leave their religious lives behind. Alison won Best Actress in a Canadian Film by Vancouver Film Critics Circle  for her role in the movie.

Pill was also part of the TV series Them, playing Betty Wendell.

Since 2020, Pill has played Dr. Agnes Jurati in CBS All Access's Star Trek series, Star Trek: Picard, centered on an older Jean-Luc Picard, the Starfleet captain from Star Trek: The Next Generation.

Personal life
Pill was engaged to actor Jay Baruchel from 2011 to 2013. Baruchel made their engagement public when he thanked Pill as his fiancée during an acceptance speech at the Genie Awards in Ottawa, Ontario. Baruchel alluded to their break-up in a Twitter posting on February 16, 2013.

Pill married actor Joshua Leonard May 24, 2015, having become engaged that January. They have a daughter, Wilder, born November 19, 2016.

Filmography

Film

Television

Music videos

Web

Theater

Discography

with Sex Bob-Omb
Soundtrack

Awards and nominations

References

External links

Alison Pill profile in The New York Observer

1985 births
20th-century Canadian actresses
21st-century Canadian actresses
Canadian child actresses
Canadian film actresses
Canadian stage actresses
Canadian television actresses
Canadian voice actresses
Living people
Actresses from Toronto
Canadian people of Estonian descent
Canadian expatriate actresses in the United States